Barbara Lynne Pillay (born 14 August 1950) is a New Zealand politician, and member of the Labour Party.

Pillay was born in Palmerston North. Before entering politics, she was a nurse, and had been active in the New Zealand Nurses Union.

Member of Parliament 

She was first elected to Parliament in the 2002 election, winning the Waitakere electorate. Her main rival was Alliance leader Laila Harré. Pillay had previously contested the safe National seat of Tamaki  in the 1999 election, and had missed out on election as a list MP by only one place.

In 2006, Pillay's Human Rights (Women in Armed Forces) Amendment Bill was drawn from the member's ballot.  The bill removed the legislative ban on women serving in combat roles in the New Zealand Defence Force.  The bill was subsequently adopted by the government before its third reading, and passed unanimously as the Human Rights (Women in Armed Forces) Amendment Act 2007.

In the 2008 general election Pillay was defeated by National candidate Paula Bennett, with a margin of 632 votes. Pillay was ranked 32 on the Labour Party list and was elected into the 49th parliament as a list MP.

On 3 December 2009 Pillay announced that she would retire at the 2011 election.

References

External links
Page on Parliamentary website

1950 births
Living people
People from Palmerston North
New Zealand Labour Party MPs
New Zealand nurses
Women members of the New Zealand House of Representatives
New Zealand list MPs
Unsuccessful candidates in the 1999 New Zealand general election
Members of the New Zealand House of Representatives
New Zealand women nurses
21st-century New Zealand politicians
21st-century New Zealand women politicians